One Caribbean is an airline based in Saint Vincent and the Grenadines.

Destinations

Fleet
As of July 2020, the One Caribbean fleet consists of the following aircraft:

Accidents and incidents
 26 August 2019: One Caribbean Saab 340 experienced a runway excursion during a takeoff attempt at Argyle International Airport.
 22 December 2019: One Caribbean Saab 340 8P-OCL experienced a tail strike on landing

References

External links
One Caribbean

Airlines of Saint Vincent and the Grenadines